Katherine Anderson (born 1944) was an American singer.

Katherine Anderson (or variants) may also refer to:

Katherine Anderson, character in The Forbidden Dance
Catherine Anderson (born 1948), writer of historical and contemporary romance novels 
Catherine Anderson (scientist), Canadian medical scientist 
Catherine Corley Anderson (1909–2001), writer of children's books
Joyce Symons (1918–2004), née Catherine Joyce Anderson, Hong Kong educator

See also
Katie Anderson (disambiguation)
Kate Anderson (disambiguation)